Gwen Buck BEM (1929–13 February 2005) was a British Paralympic athlete who competed in several sporting disciplines. She won gold medals in table tennis, lawn bowls, and swimming, and entered several athletics events across four Paralympic Games.

Personal life
Gwen Buck was born in Richmond, Surrey (now London), in 1929. She was going over a level crossing on her bicycle in 1943 when she was struck by a lorry. The accident left her with a broken back and a severed spine, and she would remain in St Peter's Hospital in Chertsey for several years. On transfer to Stoke Mandeville Hospital in 1946 she met Ludwig Guttmann who helped Buck learn to become independent as a wheelchair user. While there she developed a love for competitive sport, in particular table tennis, and she soon began competing in the Stoke Mandeville Games.

Buck moved to Worcester to attend college and train as a drawing officer tracer. She returned to Richmond, finding employment with the Ministry of Works. She met future husband and fellow wheelchair user John while there, and they married in 1951. The couple retired to Stoke Mandeville and John died in 1981. She died on 13 February 2005.

Alongside her own sporting accomplishments, Buck was always keen to encourage young people to participate. She was also consulted on the design of the Stoke Mandeville Stadium.

Sporting career
Buck's love of competitive sport was nurtured at Stoke Mandeville Hospital and she became a regular participant in the Stoke Mandeville Games. By the early 1960s she was representing Great Britain at the Commonwealth Games and the Paralympic Games.

At the 1964 Games in Tokyo, Buck partnered with Susan Cunliffe-Lister, Countess of Swinton in the Women's Doubles B Table Tennis event, winning the gold medal. At the 1968 Games in Tel Aviv she spread out into a variety of other sports including lawn bowls, swimming, and three field athletics disciplines: discus, javelin, and shot put. She won gold in both the women's pairs and singles lawn bowls as well as the 25m backstroke swim. Her final gold medal came at the 1972 Games in Heidelberg for the women's pairs lawn bowls, and went on to gain further medals in 1976 before retiring for competitive sport.

Buck was awarded the British Empire Medal in the early 1970s and also received the Sportswoman of the Year award from the Sports Writers Guild.

References

External links
Stoke Mandeville Games Roll of Honour

1929 births
2005 deaths
People from Richmond, London
Paralympic athletes of Great Britain
Paralympic lawn bowls players of Great Britain
Paralympic swimmers of Great Britain
Paralympic table tennis players of Great Britain
Paralympic gold medalists for Great Britain
Paralympic silver medalists for Great Britain
Paralympic bronze medalists for Great Britain
Athletes (track and field) at the 1968 Summer Paralympics
Athletes (track and field) at the 1972 Summer Paralympics
Lawn bowls players at the 1968 Summer Paralympics
Lawn bowls players at the 1972 Summer Paralympics
Lawn bowls players at the 1976 Summer Paralympics
Table tennis players at the 1964 Summer Paralympics
Table tennis players at the 1968 Summer Paralympics
Table tennis players at the 1972 Summer Paralympics
Table tennis players at the 1976 Summer Paralympics
Swimmers at the 1968 Summer Paralympics
Medalists at the 1964 Summer Paralympics
Medalists at the 1968 Summer Paralympics
Medalists at the 1972 Summer Paralympics
Medalists at the 1976 Summer Paralympics
English female bowls players
Paralympic medalists in table tennis
Paralympic medalists in lawn bowls
Paralympic medalists in swimming
English female discus throwers
English female javelin throwers
English female shot putters
British female backstroke swimmers
Recipients of the British Empire Medal
Wheelchair discus throwers
Wheelchair javelin throwers
Wheelchair shot putters
Paralympic discus throwers
Paralympic javelin throwers
Paralympic shot putters